Andy Laverne at Maybeck, subtitled Maybeck Recital Hall Series Volume 28 is a solo piano album by American pianist Andy LaVerne recorded at the Maybeck Recital Hall in 1993 and released on the Concord Jazz label. The album was the 28th of 42 piano recitals recorded at the hall and released on Concord.

Reception 

AllMusic reviewer Scott Yanow stated "Andy LaVerne, who is normally heard with trios, sounds surprisingly comfortable in the solo setting. His performances on this date are rhapsodic and occasionally wandering ... This is an interesting set of creative jazz".

Track listing 
 "Yesterdays" (Jerome Kern, Otto Harbach) – 5:07
 "I Loves You, Porgy" (George Gershwin, Ira Gershwin) – 9:03
 "Sweet and Lovely" (Gus Arnheim, Jules LeMare, Harry Tobias) – 5:57
 "Star Eyes" (Gene de Paul, Don Raye) – 6:06
 "My Melancholy Baby" (Ernie Burnett, George Norton) – 4:15
 "When You Wish Upon a Star" (Leigh Harline, Ned Washington) – 4:35
 "Beautiful Love" Wayne King, Victor Young, Egbert Van Alstyne, Haven Gillespie) – 5:40
 "Turn Out the Stars" (Bill Evans) – 5:23
 "Moonlight in Vermont" (Karl Suessdorf, John Blackburn) – 6:36
 "Impression for Piano" (Chick Corea) – 5:20
 "Stan Getz in Chappaqua" (Andy LaVerne) – 7:04

Personnel 
Andy LaVerne – piano

References 

Andy LaVerne live albums
1993 live albums
Concord Records live albums
Albums recorded at the Maybeck Recital Hall
Solo piano jazz albums